Auletobius is a genus of leaf and bud weevils in the family Attelabidae. There are at least 220 described species in Auletobius.

See also
 List of Auletobius species

References

Further reading

 
 
 
 
 
 
 
 
 

Attelabidae